"One More Time (The Sunshine Song)" is a song by Australian electronic music group, Groove Terminator. It was released in May 2000 on 12" vinyl and CD single as the second official single from the band's debut studio album Road Kill. The song contains an exploration of "Let the Sunshine In" and peaked at number 25 on the Australian ARIA Charts.

Track listings
12" Vinyl (Interdance/Virgin – GTPRO)
 "One More Time (The Sunshine Song)"	
 "Here Comes Another One"

CD single (Interdance/Virgin – 724389663426)
 "One More Time (The Sunshine Song)" - 3:23
 "One More Time (The Sunshine Song)" (Killers On the Loose remix) - 5:26
 "One More Time (The Sunshine Song)" (Extended mix) - 5:20
 "Afraid of the Dark Part 1" - 5:09
 "Give It Up" (Force Mass Motion mix) - 7:14

Charts

References

2000 songs
2000 singles